The S.F.X. Boys' Choir was a Catholic boys' choir that existed from 1994 to 2007. The choir received nationwide fame when the choir sang on the reworked version of The Farm's 1990 hit "Alltogethernow" and for gaining its place in the Guinness Book of World Records in 1998 for being the first (and only) choir to sing in all 49 cathedrals and abbeys in England and Wales.

History
The boys in the choir were all pupils at the college. There were 24 choristers and 18 choral scholars; included in these numbers there were traditionally a head and deputy head chorister and 6 senior choristers that were appointed every September at the start of the school's calendar year. All of the choral scholars had sung with the choir as choristers, and several of them would go on to achieve honorary chorister status which was achieved by spending all 7 school years in the choir.

The choir toured England and Continental Europe from 1995 to 2005, singing in many famous buildings across the continent, including 3 separate tours to Italy, where they twice met and sang for Pope John Paul II in 1999 and 2002. The Choir also had a 3-week tour of the Eastern United States in August 2004, singing in Boston, New York, Philadelphia and Washington D.C. In total the choir sang in an impressive 90 different cathedrals worldwide in just 11 years.

Starting with the summer of 2001 up to the summer of 2005, the choir were official guests at Windsor Castle as 'choir-in-residence' singing services in St. George's Chapel for a week; this particular tour would usually include singing a week's services in Westminster Abbey.

The Choir released 8 CDs and occasionally made radio and television appearances, including Christmas 2000, when they sang Carols 'live' on 6 consecutive evenings after Granada Reports evening news had finished. In addition they were frequently hired to sing at charity concerts, wedding and funerals. Also from 2001 to 2006 they led the Hillsborough Memorial Service at Anfield Stadium to some 7000 plus guests attending the memorial and also led the BBC Radio Merseyside Carol Service in Liverpool Cathedral which was broadcast every Christmas Eve. Also in 2001 the choir had the honour of singing a special version of "You'll Never Walk Alon" to 45,000 spectators before Liverpool's 4th-round second leg tie against AS Roma.

Perhaps their most famous moment was being part of England's Official Euro 2004 song, which was a special version of 'Alltogethernow' with the band 'The Farm'. The song reached #5 in the U.K. singles chart; the choir received a gold disc and performed the song live on Top of the Pops in June 2004; the song was also performed live at a friendly match between England and Iceland before Euro 2004 began.

The choir has a reputation as one of the leading choirs of its type in the country, a feat recognised in 2000 when they won the National School Choir Festival to become champions of England.

The choir was unique in that all 42 choir members were pupils at a comprehensive school, some coming into the choir without any real knowledge or experience at a high-level performance, which makes the choirs achievements all the more remarkable.

However, at the height of their success, due to premeditated and malicious accusations against the founder and director of music, the choir last sang in a cathedral in October 2005, when they were in residence at Canterbury Cathedral. It began 2 years of uncertainty for the long-term future of the choir, and in the months that followed the choir only sang on rare occasions; when the accusations were later quashed in court, the director of music resigned and the choir disbanded in the summer of 2007. He was later cleared of all charges and the still choir exists to an extent, under an alias name with many of the original choristers.

Choir tours
April 1994    -   Bury St. Edmunds
April 1995    -   Venice/Florence, ITALY
August 1995   -   Lincoln
March 1996    -   Kraków, POLAND
July 1996     -   St. Albans
April 1997    -   Paris, FRANCE
July 1997     -   St. Albans
October 1997  -   Canterbury
April 1998    -   Barcelona, SPAIN
July 1998     -   Oxford
October 1998  -   Canterbury
April 1999    -   York
May 1999      -   Bury St. Edmunds
August 1999   -   Rome, ITALY
October 1999  -   Canterbury
April 2000    -   Bury St. Edmunds
May 2000      -   Ripon
July 2000     -   Cologne, GERMANY
July 2000     -   St. Albans
October 2000  -   Lincoln
April 2001    -   York
May 2001      -   Bath
July 2001     -   Prague, CZECH REPUBLIC
July 2001     -   Windsor Castle
October 2001  -   Salisbury and Winchester
April 2002    -   Lincoln
May 2002      -   York
July 2002     -   Windsor Castle and Westminster Abbey
August 2002   -   Rome, ITALY
October 2002  -   St. Albans
April 2003    -   HOLLAND and BELGIUM
May 2003      -   Lincoln
July 2003     -   Windsor Castle
October 2003  -   Salisbury and Winchester
April 2004    -   York
June 2004     -   Peterborough and Ely
July 2004     -   Windsor Castle and Westminster Abbey
August 2004   -   Boston, New York and Washington, UNITED STATES OF AMERICA
October 2004  -   Salisbury and Winchester
February 2005 -   Norwich
March 2005    -   Durham
July 2005     -   Vienna, AUSTRIA
August 2005   -   Windsor Castle and Westminster Abbey
October 2005  -   Canterbury

English choirs
Musical groups from Liverpool
Musical groups established in 1994
Musical groups disestablished in 2007